The Greatest is a 1977 biographical sports film about the life of boxer Muhammad Ali, in which Ali plays himself. It was directed by Tom Gries.  The film follows Ali's life from the 1960 Summer Olympics to his regaining the heavyweight crown from George Foreman in their famous "Rumble in the Jungle" fight in 1974. The film consists largely of archival footage of Ali's boxing matches used in the screenplay.

The film is based on the book The Greatest: My Own Story written by Muhammad Ali and Richard Durham and edited by Toni Morrison.

The song "The Greatest Love of All" was written for this film by Michael Masser (music) and Linda Creed, (lyrics) and sung by George Benson; it was later covered and made a Billboard Hot 100 #1 single by Whitney Houston.

Plot
The story of Cassius Clay, who became Muhammed Ali and the most charismatic heavyweight champion of our time. Tracing his meteoric rise from his Olympic gold medal as a light-heavyweight at Rome in 1960, his conversion to Islam, his refusal to serve in the Vietnam war, to his triumphant return to the ring.

Cast
 Muhammad Ali as Himself
Chip McAllister as Young Cassius Clay / Muhammad Ali
 Ernest Borgnine as Angelo Dundee
 John Marley as Dr. Ferdie Pacheco
 Lloyd Haynes as Jabir Herbert Muhammad
 Robert Duvall as Bill McDonald
 David Huddleston as Cruikshank
 Ben Johnson as Hollis
 James Earl Jones as Malcolm X
 Dina Merrill as "Velvet" Green
 Roger E. Mosley as Sonny Liston
 Paul Winfield as Mr. Eskridge
 Annazette Chase as Belinda Boyd Ali
 Mira Waters as Ruby Sanderson
 Drew Bundini Brown as Himself
 Malachi Throne as Payton Jory
 Richard Venture as Colonel Cedrich
 Arthur Adams as Cassius Marcellus Clay Sr.
 Stack Pierce as Rahaman
 Paul Mantee as Carrara
 Skip Homeier as Major Canlan
 David Clennon as Captain
 Nai Bonet as Suzie Gomez

Rahman Ali, Howard Bingham, Harold Conrad, Don Dunphy, Lloyd Wells, Pat Patterson, and Gene Kilroy appear as themselves.

There are many uncredited roles in the film including some major characters, such as Ruby Sanderson and his girlfriend, Belinda Board, who became his wife, and Herbert Mohammed, son of Elijah Muhammad, who was Ali's manager at one point.

Lonette McKee was originally going to portray the role played by Annazette Chase.

Soundtrack
All music composed and produced by Michael Masser, and arranged by Masser and Lee Holdridge.

Reception
Vincent Canby of The New York Times called the film "a charming curio of a sort Hollywood doesn't seem to make much anymore." Kevin Thomas of the Los Angeles Times called the film "potent pop biography, lively and entertaining, in which the irrepressible world's heavyweight boxing champion projects exactly the image he wants us to have." Gene Siskel of the Chicago Tribune gave the film 2.5 stars out of 4 and wrote, "As a diverting entertainment, 'The Greatest' is more than satisfactory." Arthur D. Murphy of Variety wrote that Ali brought the film "an authority and a presence that lift John Marshall's production above some of the limitations inherent in any film bio." David Badder of The Monthly Film Bulletin stated, "The Greatest delivers exactly what one would expect: a hagiographical account of Ali's best-known exploits, giving full rein to the inimitable, volatile personality but in the process applying liberal coats of whitewash."

References

External links 
 
 
 
 

1977 films
1970s biographical films
American biographical films
British biographical films
British Lion Films films
British boxing films
Columbia Pictures films
EMI Films films
Films about Muhammad Ali
Films about the 1960 Summer Olympics
Films about Olympic boxing
Films directed by Tom Gries
Films set in the 1960s
Films set in the 1970s
Films with screenplays by Ring Lardner Jr.
Sports films based on actual events
1970s English-language films
1970s American films
1970s British films